Women in conservatism in the United States have advocated for social, political, economic, and cultural conservative policies since anti-suffragism. Leading conservative women such as Phyllis Schlafly have expressed that women should embrace their privileged essential nature. This thread of belief can be traced through the anti-suffrage movement, the Red Scare, and the Reagan Era, and is still present in the 21st century, especially in several conservative women's organizations such as Concerned Women for America and the Independent Women's Forum.

History

Anti-suffragism

Women first began to oppose suffrage in Massachusetts in 1868. They succeeded in blocking the proposal, and this caused the movement to gain momentum. The National Association Opposed to Women Suffrage (NAOWS) was thus formed by Josephine Dodge in 1911 with approximately 350,000 members. This organization mostly consisted of wealthy women who were often wives of politicians. These women helped defeat nearly 40 suffrage proposals, and published the Women's Protest to voice their agenda nationwide. Dodge and the organization argued that women should stay out of politics to be more efficient and diligent in "work for which her nature and her training fit her." These anti-feminist beliefs are what shaped the anti-suffrage crusade.

Goldwater campaign 
A major source of conservative women's activism was in Southern California in the 1950s and 1960s, particularly in Orange County, California.  Female conservative activists organized around their opposition to internationalism, Communism and the welfare state. These women mainly consisted of "suburban warriors," or middle class housewives who feared that their Christian nation was under attack. Increasing Cold War tensions and fears of Communism allowed for these women to mobilize groups such as the John Birch Society and the American Civil Liberties Union to pursue their political agendas. They eventually backed politician Barry Goldwater and successfully campaigned for him to become the presidential candidate for the Republican Party in 1964. However, Goldwater lost the national election to Lyndon Johnson in a landslide. Still, his nomination illustrated the shift from moderation to more hardline stances in many members of the Republican Party. His campaign also showcased the success of conservative grassroots organizations and mobilization.

Reagan era 
After Goldwater's defeat, grassroots conservatives had to rethink their strategy. Thus, conservative women soon turned to Ronald Reagan. He won over the support of the women of Orange County and successfully unified the party when he was elected Governor of California in the 1966 election. However, there were some women that opposed him due to his more mainstream views. Cyril Stevenson, a prominent leader of the California Republican Assembly, sought to undermine his candidacy. These attempts failed, nevertheless, as Reagan was elected. However, a significantly lower number of women than men voted for Reagan when he was eventually elected President of the United States. Reagan gained the support of more conservative women by attempting to close this "gender gap." He enacted equal rights policies attempting to end discrimination laws. Still, Reagan's election showed that the new Republican majority, although still coined "mainstream," was now built on anti-liberalism and contained more conservative views, and conservative women activists like the women of Orange County played a very important role in that shift.

Mama grizzlies 

The term "mama grizzlies" originated from Sarah Palin's endorsement of female candidates in the 2010 primaries, whom she gave this title to. "Mama grizzly" was officially coined in Palin's May 2010 speech for the Susan B. Anthony List Pro-Life group, and it was later used in Palin's own advertisements. This description is used to describe conservative women who wish to play an active role in politics, whether it be through running for office or through campaigning for conservative ideas and topics. These women also refer to themselves as Susan B. Anthony feminists, agreeing with the ideas that Anthony argued for such as political activism but not the feminist ideas more modern than those, such as the pro-choice movement. Because this term originated from Palin's endorsement and was used in Palin's advertisements, it has been linked to her and the Tea Party, which she has affiliated with. These "mama grizzlies" are self-proclaimed conservative feminists, with Palin herself publicly identifying as a feminist in 2008. In the spread of this new classification for women, where women's advocacy took on a unique form, Palin called for a rise of a new breed of feminism, and this idea quickly came to popularity among right-wing women.

Critics of the "mama grizzly" viewpoint do not agree that Palin's ideas are feminist, such as her anti-abortion views. Palin's viewpoint has been opposed by socially liberal feminists, with some such as Jessica Valenti claiming that this angle was used to take advantage of the presence of feminists like Hillary Clinton in the 2008 presidential election cycle. Other complaints draw from the group's denial of systemic sexism and oppression due to gender, with critics believing that "mama grizzly" ideals could not be labeled as feminist if they were to dismiss these matters.

Trump era 
Republican President Donald Trump received the support of many conservative women, with groups such as Women for Trump backing his presidency. In the 2016 presidential election, according to exit poll data, 41% of women voted for Trump, as opposed to 54% of women who voted for Hillary Clinton. In the 2020 presidential election, Trump's support among women increased slightly, as he received 42% of women's vote, a 1% increase from the previous election.

In 21st-century politics

Michele Bachmann 
Michele Bachmann unsuccessfully ran for the Republican nomination for president in the 2012 election. Although Bachmann attempted to utilize conservative views that appeal to the Tea Party movement, the media's coverage of her was very different from her male candidates. The media instead focused on her migraines, her marriage, and her hair and makeup style choices. However, her campaign started strongly, as she performed well in the first presidential debate and soon led in the primary polls. Bachmann was forced to drop out of the race after her poor performance in the Iowa caucuses. Still, many conservative women continue to support her, and this support along with that of Sarah Palin in 2008 has showed that conservatives now seriously consider women for major political roles. Bachmann's run also sparked the debate of women's role in politics and public policy, and whether or not gender roles should be reexamined.

Carly Fiorina 
Carly Fiorina began as a successful businesswoman, becoming the CEO of Hewlett-Packard in 1999. However, Fiorina was fired from her position in 2005 due to a number of factors such as economic conditions, operational failures, gender bias, and questionable ethics. Fiorina turned to politics and won the Republican nomination for senator of California in 2010, but lost to incumbent Democrat Barbara Boxer. She quickly gathered acclaim from the Republican base, and was appointed chair of the American Conservative Union Foundation in 2013. In 2015, she announced her candidacy for President of the United States. Although she was the only viable female candidate in the Republican primary, she was reluctant to indulge in gender politics, due to both her conservative and corporate personas. Fiorina dropped out of the race in February 2016 to endorse Ted Cruz, and soon became his running mate.

Sarah Palin 
In 2010, Sarah Palin, whose nomination to run for Vice President with Republican presidential candidate John McCain was a visible ascent of a conservative woman in 2008, declared a new voice for those women and supported many women for Congress whom she labeled "Mama Grizzlies." Many supported Palin because of her stances against abortion and other issues that defy feminists; her "soccer mom" persona also was very appealing. Palin and McCain eventually lost the general election.

Notable figures

Ann Coulter 
As a political commentator, Ann Coulter has written numerous books and columns, and often appears as a political commentator on conservative television, she is one of the most recognizable and influential voices for conservative women today, as she has started many conservative political trends such as the continual critique of mainstream liberalism.

Phyllis Schlafly 

As a conservative, Phyllis Schlafly argued that the female gender is actually privileged, and that women have "the most rights and rewards, and the fewest duties." She advocated for women to stay out of politics and the workplace. She argued against feminists and claimed that they actually take away rights from women. She thus led the opposition against the Equal Rights Amendment, and successfully prevented the amendment from being ratified by the required number of states before the ratification deadline set by the Congress. Schlafly argued that the amendment stripped women of what she saw as their special "privileges." She saw it as anti-Christian and argued that it promoted policies such as abortion, sex education, and LGBTQ rights. She also claimed that it would give power to federal courts and take power away from the states.

Other figures

Academia
Elizabeth Fox-Genovese - Historian
Alice von Hildebrand - Philosopher and Catholic theologian

Arts
Kirstie Alley - Actress
Stacey Dash - Actress
Mary Hart - Actress
Patricia Heaton - Actress
Victoria Jackson - Actress
Cheryl Ladd - Actress
Kristy Swanson - Actress
Shirley Temple - Actress & 27th United States Ambassador to Czechoslovakia
Joy Villa - Actress/Singer 
Raquel Welch - Actress

Business and law
Amy Coney Barrett - U.S. Associate Supreme Court Justice
Pam Bondi - 37th Florida Attorney General
Barbara Lagoa - U.S. Circuit Judge
Sue Lowden - Businesswoman
Jeanine Pirro - District Attorney of Westchester County & television host
Allison Jones Rushing - U.S. Circuit Judge

Politics
Diane Black - U.S. Representative from Tennessee
Marsha Blackburn - U.S. Senator from Tennessee
Lauren Boebert - U.S. Representative from Colorado
Jan Brewer - 22nd Governor of Arizona
Bay Buchanan - 37th Treasurer of the United States
Kat Cammack - U.S. Representative from Florida 
Elaine Chao - 18th United States Secretary of Transportation & 24th United States Secretary of Labor
Liz Cheney - U.S. Representative from Wyoming
Kellyanne Conway - Counselor to the President
Elizabeth Dole - U.S. Senator from North Carolina 
Joni Ernst - U.S. Senator from Iowa
Mary Fallin - 27th Governor of Oklahoma & previously U.S. Representative
Deb Fischer - U.S. Senator from Nebraska
Ezola Foster - 2000 candidate for Vice President of Pat Buchanan
Virginia Foxx - U.S. Representative from North Carolina
Marjorie Taylor Greene - U.S. Representative from Georgia
Nikki Haley - 29th U.S. Ambassador to the United Nations & 116th Governor of South Carolina
Yvette Herrell - U.S. Representative from New Mexico
Paula Hawkins - U.S. Senator from Florida
Ashley Hinson - U.S. Representative from Iowa 
Kay Hutchison - 22nd U.S. Permanent Representative to NATO & previously U.S. Senator from Texas
Kay Ivey - 54th Governor of Alabama
Alveda King - U.S. State Representative from Georgia & activist
Jeane Kirkpatrick - 16th U.S. Ambassador to the United Nations
Kelly Loeffler - U.S. Senator from Georgia
Mia Love - U.S. Representative from Utah
Clare Boothe Luce - U.S. Ambassador to Italy
Susana Martinez - 31st Governor of New Mexico
Lisa McClain - U.S. Representative from Michigan 
Kayleigh McEnany - 33rd White House Press Secretary
Martha McSally - U.S. Representative (2015-2019) and Senator from Arizona (2019-2020)
Mary Miller - U.S. Representative from Illinois 
Kristi Noem - 33rd Governor of South Dakota & previously U.S. Representative
Kim Reynolds - 43rd Governor of Iowa
Condoleezza Rice - 66th United States Secretary of State
Cathy McMorris Rodgers - U.S. Representative from Washington
Maria Elvira Salazar - U.S. Representative from Florida
Sarah Sanders - 31st White House Press Secretary
Elise Stefanik - U.S. Representative from New York
Claudia Tenney - U.S. Representative from New York
Ivanka Trump - U.S. Director of the Office of Economic Initiatives and Entrepreneurship
Melania Trump - First Lady of the United States
Mimi Walters - U.S. Representative from California

Miscellaneous
Deneen Borelli - Author and television personality
Mona Charen - Journalist
Danielle Crittenden - Journalist
S. E. Cupp - Political correspondent
Maggie Gallagher
Mary Katharine Ham
Solange Hertz - Traditionalist Catholic author
Margaret Hoover - Political commentator
Laura Ingraham - Television host
Beverly LaHaye - Author
Tomi Lahren - Political commentator
Kathryn Jean Lopez - Columnist
Michelle Malkin - Political commentator
Peggy Noonan - Columnist
Kate O'Beirne - Editor
Candace Owens - Political commentator
Star Parker - Political commentator
Katie Pavlich - Political commentator
Katrina Pierson - Activist and political commentator 
Laura Schlessinger - Talk radio host
Tara Setmayer - Political commentator
Allie Beth Stuckey - Political commentator
Suzanne Venker - Author
Liz Wheeler - Political commentator

Organizations

Concerned Women for America 
Concerned Women for America is a religious organization that seeks to promote Christian values. The ideology falls under that of social conservatism. Their agenda includes stopping the "decline in moral values of our nation," restricting access to pornography, defunding the United Nations, defining the definition of family as heterosexually led, opposing abortion, and advocating for prayer in schools. The CWA promotes anti-feminist ideologies, such as a woman's primary role is that of a mother and homemaker, while simultaneously engaging in identity politics in an attempt to prove this. This ideology can be referred to as a maternalist frame that relies on gendered ideas of motherhood and a gender essentialism frame that capitalizes off of set notions of gender difference. These frames both narrow the scope of possibilities for women and reinforce patriarchy while also highlighting the importance of women to the family. These frames are contradictory in nature because they urge women to get involved in politics so they can tell politicians they shouldn’t be getting involved with anything other than motherhood.

Independent Women's Forum 
The Independent Women's Forum is an organization based more in fiscal conservatism. Unlike the CWA, its agenda includes opposition to the Violence Against Women Act, supporting the war in Iraq and women's rights there, challenging feminist professors on college campuses, opposing affirmative action, and other fiscal conservative policies. However, IWF is more based in libertarianism than the Republican Party since they strive for economic freedom. Similarly to CWA, IWF also engages in identity politics to attract career women to the organization; it advocates. IWF is relatively small at 1,600 members, but is constantly growing and thriving.

Other organizations 
 Clare Boothe Luce Policy Institute
 Eagle Forum
 Network of enlightened Women
 Susan B. Anthony List
 Value in Electing Women Political Action Committee (VIEWPAC)
 Winning for Women

See also

 Equity feminism
 Mama grizzly

References

External links
 Top 10 Most Influential Conservative Women in America
 Time to Get Your 2012 'Great American Conservative Women' Calendar

Conservatism in the United States
American women in politics
Women in the United States